Kim Seung-dae (born 1 April 1991) is a South Korean footballer who plays as forward for  Pohang Steelers.

Career
Kim joined Pohang Steelers before the start of the 2013 season and scored his debut goal in the 2013 Korean FA Cup finals against Jeonbuk Hyundai Motors. He played in the 2014 Asian Games where the South Korea U-23 national team won gold on home soil.

Career statistics

Club

International career

International goals

Honours

Club
 Pohang Steelers
 K League 1 : 2013
 Korean FA Cup : 2013

 Jeonbuk Hyundai Motors
 K League 1 : 2019

International

South Korea
 EAFF East Asian Cup : 2015, 2019

South Korea U23
 Asian Games Gold Medal: 2014

Individual
 K-League Rookie of the Year Award: 2014

References

External links 
 Kim Seung-dae – National Team Stats at KFA 
 
 
 
 Kim Seung-dae at Asian Games Incheon 2014

1991 births
Living people
Association football forwards
South Korean footballers
South Korea international footballers
Pohang Steelers players
Yanbian Funde F.C. players
K League 1 players
Chinese Super League players
Expatriate footballers in China
South Korean expatriate sportspeople in China
Footballers at the 2014 Asian Games
Asian Games medalists in football
Yeungnam University alumni
Asian Games gold medalists for South Korea
Medalists at the 2014 Asian Games
Jeonbuk Hyundai Motors players
People from Pohang
Sportspeople from North Gyeongsang Province